Karl Stavem (born 4 November 1970), is a Norwegian casting director, producer, actor and director known for his work in film, documentary work and television. He is most well known for his work as a casting director for movies such as Conviction (2010) which starred Hilary Swank and Sam Rockwell.

Education 
Stavem was born in Norway, and grew up in Jeløy, an island near Moss, from age 6. He attended Noroff (Oslo), and Westerdals film schools.

Casting

Filmography

Television

Stage

References

External links 

 

1970 births
Living people
Norwegian film actors
Norwegian television actors